Victoria in Dover (aka The Story of Vickie) is a 1954 Austrian historical romantic comedy film directed by Ernst Marischka and starring Romy Schneider, Adrian Hoven and Magda Schneider. It is a remake of the 1936 Erich Engel film Victoria in Dover, which was based on a 1932 play by Sil-Vara. Romy Schneider's performance as a spirited young royal was a lead-in to her best known role in Sissi and its sequels, although Marischka had originally intended to cast Sonja Ziemann as Victoria.

It was shot at the Sievering Studios in Vienna and on location around the city. The film's sets were designed by the art director Fritz Jüptner-Jonstorff.

Synopsis
After her Prime Minister Lord Melbourne arranges a marriage for her with the German Prince Albert, the young Queen Victoria decides to leave London and spend some time in Kent. While there she meets a handsome young German and falls in love, unaware that he is her intended husband Albert.

Cast

References

Bibliography 
 Fritsche, Maria. Homemade Men in Postwar Austrian Cinema: Nationhood, Genre and Masculinity. Berghahn Books, 2013.

External links
 

1954 films
Austrian romantic comedy films
Austrian historical comedy films
1950s historical comedy films
1954 romantic comedy films
Cultural depictions of Queen Victoria on film
Films set in London
Films set in Kent
Films set in the 1830s
1950s German-language films
Films directed by Ernst Marischka
Remakes of German films
1950s historical romance films
Films shot at Sievering Studios